Ofir Haivry (born 1964) is an Israeli political philosopher and historian. He is currently Vice President at The Herzl Institute - Machon Herzl in Jerusalem. He was one of the founders of The Shalem Center, one of the founders of Shalem College, and founding editor-in-chief of the journal Azure: Ideas for the Jewish Nation.

Early life and education

Haivry holds a BA and MA in history from Tel Aviv University, and a PhD in intellectual history from University College London.   In 2007 he was awarded the Annual Fellowship co-sponsored by the Folger Institute and the American Society of Eighteenth Century Studies (ASECS).
Haivry served as Foreign News editor, Haolam Hazeh newsweekly, Israel, in 1990-1993.

Career

Haivry was one of the founders of the Shalem Center in Jerusalem in 1994, and of Shalem College in 2009.

He was the founding editor-in-chief of the journal Azure: Ideas for the Jewish Nation.

Haivry's first book, John Selden and the Western Political Tradition, (Cambridge University Press, 2017) .  He has published in scholarly and popular venues, among which articles in books and journals by Columbia University Press, Paris University, and Shalem Press, as well as with Mosaic Magazine, Yedioth Aharonot, Azure, Ynet, Maariv, NRG, Haaretz, Limes – Rivista Italiana di Geopolitica.

Haivry is currently a member of Israel's Council for Higher Education (CHE), of Israel's Council for Archeology, of the joint CHE-Government team overseeing the I-CORE (Israel Centers of Research Excellence), and a member of the Bilateral Steering Team for promoting Academic Cooperations between Israel and Italy. He was a member of the 2010, Close Committee assessing the Israel Prize regulations (report adopted by Minister of Education), and of the 2009-2010 Steering Committee of TAMAR Project for the restoration and empowerment of Israel’s National Heritage Infrastructure (at the Prime Minister's office).

Publications

Books
John Selden and the Western Political Tradition  (Cambridge University Press, 2017)

Articles
 “Israel in the Eye of the Hurricane” in Mosaic Magazine, January, 2014.
 “Between reason and imagination: Gilliam’s vision and European Nationalism” in J. Birkenstein, The Cinema of Terry Gilliam: It's a Mad World (Columbia University Press, New York, 2013).
 “John Selden and the early modern debate over the foundations of political order” in Annuaire de l’Institut Michel Villey 3/2011 (Paris University Press, 2012) – volume on John Selden.
 “Il declino demografico, un mito duro a morire” in Limes – Rivista Italiana di Geopolitica 5/2011 (Gruppo Editoriale L’Espresso) [Italian]
 “Introduction” first complete Hebrew translation of: A. de Tocqueville, Democracy in America (Shalem Press, Jerusalem, 2008) [Hebrew].
 “On Zion: A Reality That Fashions Imagination” in M. Oren et al. (Eds.) New Essays On Zionism (Shalem Press, Jerusalem, 2006).

References

1964 births
Living people
Israeli historians
Israeli political scientists
Tel Aviv University alumni
Alumni of University College London